Navia may refer to:
Navia (San Luis), a village and municipality in San Luis Province, Argentina
Navia, Iran, a village in North Khorasan Province
Navia, Asturias, a municipality in the Principality of Asturias, Spain
Navia (parish)
Navia (river), in Spain
Navia (plant), a genus of bromeliads
Navia (spirit), a type of water deities in Slavic paganism
Navia (vehicle), an electric eight-passenger robotically-driven vehicle made by France’s Induct Technology
Navia Nguyen (born 1973), Vietnamese-American model and actress
Reinaldo Navia (born 1978), Chilean football striker
Rafael Nieto Navia (born 1938), Colombian jurist, political scientist and professor